Hardebek is a municipality in the district of Segeberg, in Schleswig-Holstein, Germany. As of 2021, the mayor is Wolfgang Wilczek, in office since 2018. It has 466 inhabitants, which is a population density of 46.6 /km2 (120.6 /sq mi).

It has three nuclear power stations nearby:
 Brokdorf Nuclear Power Plant (37.6 km),
 Brunsbüttel Nuclear Power Plant (45 km), and
 Krümmel Nuclear Power Plant (73.5 km).

References

Municipalities in Schleswig-Holstein
Segeberg